Shanghai Airport Authority (SAA) is a state-owned enterprise of the Shanghai Municipal Government and operates both Pudong (PVG) and Hongqiao (SHA) airports in Shanghai, China. SAA revealed its new brand identity AVINEX on 29 June 2021, its 100th anniversary.

SAA was established in 1998 and aims to manage Shanghai airports to be the core airport hub in the Asia-Pacific region.

Link
Shanghai Airport Authority

References

Companies listed on the Shanghai Stock Exchange
Companies owned by the provincial government of China
Airport operators of China
Companies based in Shanghai
Transport companies established in 1998